La morte accarezza a mezzanotte (Death Walks at Midnight) is a 1972 giallo film directed by Luciano Ercoli. The film was written by Ernesto Gastaldi, Guido Leoni, Mahnahén Velasco and Mannuel Velasco. It starred Susan Scott, Simón Andreu, Peter Martell, Claudie Lange and Carlo Gentili.

Plot 

Fashion model Valentina (Susan Scott) agrees to help her journalist boyfriend Giò Baldi (Simón Andreu) research the effects of LSD. While under the influence of the drug, Valentina sees a man bludgeon a woman to death with a spiked gauntlet. Baldi publishes a report of her hallucinations; however, Valentina believes what she has seen is real. She begins to realise that the killer is stalking her, although neither Baldi nor the police will believe what she tells them.

Production 
La morte accarezza a mezzanotte marks the third collaboration between director Luciano Ercoli and screenwriter Ernesto Gastaldi, who had previously worked together on 1971's La morte cammina con i tacchi alti and 1970's Le foto proibite di una signora per bene. Ercoli's wife Nieves Navarro, credited here as Susan Scott, featured in several of his other films, often in similar roles as "tough, independent" women. The director's preference for this type of character has been noted as being inspired by fumetti, a form of Italian photonovel often featuring such roles.

Release 
La morte accarezza a mezzanotte was released in Italy on 17 November 1972. It was released under that title in English by NoShame Films as part of a box set with La morte cammina con i tacchi alti, titled Luciano Ercoli's Death Box Set. It has also been distributed under the title Muerte acaricia a medianoche, and  Cry Out in Terror.

Reception 

Writing for Allmovie, Robert Firsching gave the film one star out of five, calling it "laughably camp fun". Writing for DVD Talk, Stuart Galbraith described the film as having "an exciting knock-down, drag-out climax". Reviewing the film alongside La morte cammina i tachi alti, Galbraith felt that La morte accarezza a mezzanotte had "a stronger, less-predictable screenplay [and] a bit more visual flair" than its companion film; he ultimately rated both films together three-and-a-half stars out of five. A retrospective of Gastaldi's films by the Italian magazine Nocturno described it as "flow[ing] smoothly and with some good jolts", highlighting Scott's screen presence as the film's main strength.

Notes

Footnotes

References

External links 

 
 

Giallo films
1972 films
1970s thriller films
1970s Italian-language films
Films directed by Luciano Ercoli
Spanish thriller films
Films with screenplays by Ernesto Gastaldi
Films scored by Gianni Ferrio
Films set in Milan
Films set in Lombardy
1970s Italian films